Sport Club Municipal Râmnicu Vâlcea, commonly known as SCM Râmnicu Vâlcea or Râmnicu Vâlcea, is a Romanian football team from Râmnicu Vâlcea, Vâlcea County. The club is currently playing in Liga IV, after spending 12 years in the Liga II, the club was reorganized in the summer of 2017 after some financial problems.

History

Early years
CSM Râmnicu Vâlcea was the descendant of a much greater club, Chimia Râmnicu Vâlcea, founded in 1946 and dissolved in 2004. In their first year after founding they won 2004–2005 season of Liga III and were promoted for the first time ever in the Liga II, the second level of Romanian football. Their best performances was reaching the third place in 2006–07, 2007–08, 2013–14 seasons of that championship. They were almost promoted in Liga I all of these years.

Promotion Dispute (2014)
Since they were promoted from Liga III, the team played many years in the second league, but in the 2013–14, the team finished 3rd in the competition play-off, however the 3rd place does not guarantee the promotion to Liga I, but the officials and the fans says that the team from that won first place CSU Craiova, does not have the right to compete in Liga I, because after they were founded they started from Liga II not from the county leagues and that would be an abuse to have their team in Liga I after only one year being founded. They almost succeeded to win the spot in Liga I at that time. They still try to get a spot in Liga I from the Court of Arbitration for Sport.

Financial problems
In December 2016, Râmnicu Vâlcea Municipality withdrew its financial support for the football team. The other shareholder of the team, businessman Dan Nițu, announced than that he can't sustain financially the team alone. After that, almost all the players left the team and signed contracts with other clubs.

In February 2017, Lucian Munteanu, the club president announced that only the senior team will be dissolved and youth teams will continue to play in their championships. Also some players went on loan to other teams.

At youth level CSM continued until the summer of the same year and achieved an unexpected final of the U-17 Championship, but lost at penalty shoot-out against Atletico Vaslui. After that CSM was dissolved also at youth level.

Rebirth
The club was refounded in the summer of 2017 as SCM Râmnicu Vâlcea, an almost identical name with the old one, SCM means Sport Club of Municipality instead of CSM which meant Municipality Sports Club, also the club colours were changed from white and blue to red and blue. Players moved from CSM to the new club and also the senior team was re-established and enrolled in the Liga IV.

Honours

Domestic

Leagues
Liga II
Third place (3): 2006–07, 2007–08, 2013–14
Liga III
Winners (1): 2004–05

Current squad

Club officials

Board of directors

Current technical staff

League history

References

External links
 
 SCM Râmnicu Vâlcea at AJF Vâlcea

 
Association football clubs established in 2004
Football clubs in Vâlcea County
Liga II clubs
Liga III clubs
Liga IV clubs
2004 establishments in Romania
Râmnicu Vâlcea